The Baker Correctional Institution  is a state prison for men located in Sanderson, Baker County, Florida, owned and operated by the Florida Department of Corrections.  

Since November 2009, Baker's mission is to "prepare inmates for work release and aid in a successful re-entry into society."  The facility has a mix of security levels, including minimum, medium, and close.  Baker Correctional Institution opened in 1978 and has a maximum capacity of 1165 inmates.

In July 2015 two inmates died within a week:  Antonio Gallashaw on the 28th, and Denis Robinson on the 30th.

References

Prisons in Florida
Buildings and structures in Baker County, Florida
1978 establishments in Florida